In enzymology, a quinate dehydrogenase is an enzyme that catalyzes the chemical reaction

L-quinate + NAD+  3-dehydroquinate + NADH + H+

Thus, the two substrates of this enzyme are L-quinate and NAD+, whereas its 3 products are 3-dehydroquinate, NADH, and H+.

This enzyme belongs to the family of oxidoreductases, specifically those acting on the CH-OH group of donor with NAD+ or NADP+ as acceptor.  The systematic name of this enzyme class is L-quinate:NAD+ 3-oxidoreductase. Other names in common use include quinic dehydrogenase, quinate:NAD oxidoreductase, quinate 5-dehydrogenase, and quinate:NAD+ 5-oxidoreductase.  This enzyme participates in phenylalanine, tyrosine and tryptophan biosynthesis.

References

 
 

EC 1.1.1
NADH-dependent enzymes
Enzymes of unknown structure